Anoglypta is a genus of air-breathing land snail, a terrestrial pulmonate gastropod mollusk in the family Caryodidae.

Species
This genus contains the following species:
 Anoglypta launcestonensis Reeve, 1853 - Granulated Tasmanian snail

References

Caryodidae
Taxonomy articles created by Polbot